Veedu Oru Swargam is a 1977 Indian Malayalam film, directed by Jeassy and produced by Isaac John. The film stars Prem Nazir, Sheela, Sukumari and KPAC Lalitha in the lead roles. The film has musical score by G. Devarajan.

Cast
Prem Nazir
Sheela
Sukumari
KPAC Lalitha
Adoor Bhasi
Sankaradi
Janardanan
K. P. Ummer
M. G. Soman
Vidhubala

Soundtrack
The music was composed by G. Devarajan and the lyrics were written by Yusufali Kechery.

References

External links
 

1977 films
1970s Malayalam-language films